Birhan Woldu (born 1981) is an Ethiopian famed for being the starving child, near death, shown in a video at Live Aid in 1985.

Woldu was originally found in 1984 by a CBC documentary crew led by Brian Stewart and Tony Burman. Her family walked from their village in Tigray to Mek'ele in hopes of finding food or relief. The harsh journey proved too much for many: her sister Azmara died during the trip; she and her mother both became very ill.

While at the aid center her father, Woldu Menameno, was told by the attending nuns that his daughter Birhan, would likely die within the next fifteen minutes. Her father, preparing for the worst, wrapped her in a white burial shroud, and began to dig a grave. However, as he began to bury his daughter, he noticed a faint pulse. He alerted the nurses, who restored her to health.

She subsequently became the iconic symbol that rallied the world to address the 19841985 Ethiopian Famine. British Prime Minister Tony Blair said the image of her face "changed his life." In 2004, an adult Woldu appeared in Band Aid 20's music video for "Do They Know It's Christmas".

In 2005, Bob Geldof had the film played again, at the Live 8 concert in London, then introduced Woldu, who thanked the audience for their support, in her native tongue. She remained on stage for the first part of Madonna's performance of "Like a Prayer". It was reported 13 January 2010 that Birhan, then a nurse, had become engaged to Birhanu Meresa, whom she had met while the two attended an agricultural college in Ethiopia.

References

External links 
 Indepth: Ethiopia - Strange Destiny CBC website
 Original TV report that inspired the aid projects around the world (1 November 1984)

1981 births
Ethiopian nurses
Live 8
Living people